The women's 3000 metres race of the 2015–16 ISU Speed Skating World Cup 4, arranged in the Thialf arena in Heerenveen, Netherlands, was held on 11 December 2015.

Martina Sáblíková of the Czech Republic won the race, while Annouk van der Weijden of the Netherlands came second, and Olga Graf of Russia came third. Zhao Xin of China won the Division B race.

Results
The race took place on Friday, 11 December, with Division B scheduled in the afternoon session, at 12:45, and Division A scheduled in the evening session, at 15:55.

Division A

Division B

References

Women 3000
4